The 18th Dallas–Fort Worth Film Critics Association Awards honoring the best in film for 2012 were announced on December 18, 2012. These awards "recognizing extraordinary accomplishment in film" are presented annually by the Dallas–Fort Worth Film Critics Association (DFWFCA), based in the Dallas–Fort Worth metroplex region of Texas. The organization, founded in 1990, includes 30 film critics for print, radio, television, and internet publications based in north Texas. The Dallas–Fort Worth Film Critics Association began presenting its annual awards list in 1991.

Lincoln was the DFWFCA's most awarded film of 2012 taking top honors for Best Picture, Best Actor (Daniel Day-Lewis), Best Supporting Actor (Tommy Lee Jones), and Best Supporting Actress (Sally Field), plus the association's inaugural award for Best Musical Score (John Williams). This continued a trend of critics groups across the United States giving their top prizes to the film about the final four months of the life of Abraham Lincoln, the 16th President of the United States, and his efforts to outlaw slavery with the Thirteenth Amendment.

Only one other film, Zero Dark Thirty earned multiple 2012 honors from the DFWFCA. It received top honors for Best Actress (Jessica Chastain), Best Director (Kathryn Bigelow), and Best Screenplay (Mark Boal). The other films earning honors were Austria's Amour for Best Foreign Language Film, Searching for Sugar Man as Best Documentary Film, ParaNorman for Best Animated Film, and Life of Pi for Best Cinematography (Claudio Miranda).

Along with the 12 "best of" category awards, the group also presented the Russell Smith Award to Beasts of the Southern Wild as the "best low-budget or cutting-edge independent film" of the year. The award is named in honor of late Dallas Morning News film critic Russell Smith.

Winners
Winners are listed first and highlighted with boldface. Other films ranked by the annual poll are listed in order. While most categories saw 5 honorees named, categories ranged from as many as 10 (Best Film) to as few as 2 (Best Cinematography, Best Screenplay) plus the new Best Musical Score category having only the winner announced.

Category awards

Individual awards

Russell Smith Award
 Beasts of the Southern Wild, for "best low-budget or cutting-edge independent film"

References

2012
2012 film awards